Blanche Margaret Milligan was an early 20th century American author of books for pre-teen and teenage readers.  Her books were published by the Lutheran Book Concern (Evangelical Lutheran Joint Synod of Ohio), which was established in 1881 in Columbus, Ohio, and which became a part of the American Lutheran Church in 1930.  The books feature stories and adventures of young characters who learn the love of God through everyday occurrences.

Bibliography 
Mystery Island. A Story for Junior Boys and Girls (1932)
Two Young Patriots:  A Story of the Days of the American Revolution (1915) 
A Christmas Surprise (1916)
The Lost Twins: A Story for Junior Boys and Girls
The School in the Valley (1921)
Victories in the Wildwood (1917)
Matilda (1916)
The Helpful Dozen (1929)
At Camp in Old Virginia

References

20th-century American non-fiction writers
Year of birth missing
Place of birth missing
Year of death missing
Place of death missing
American religious writers
20th-century American women writers
Women religious writers
American women non-fiction writers